Nikki Yeoh (born 24 May 1973) is a British jazz pianist who has worked with Courtney Pine, Cleveland Watkiss, Steve Williamson, Chante Moore, The Roots and Neneh Cherry. Born in London, Yeoh is of mixed race origin, having a father from Malaysia and a British mother. Some of her first music teachers were Don Rendell and Ian Carr.

Yeoh has a long-standing collaboration with drummer Mark Mondesir and his bassist brother, Michael Mondesir in the jazz trio Infinitum. Yeoh was the Musical Director for the finalists of the BBC Young Jazz Musician 2020 

In 2022, she was appointed at MEI (Music Education Islington) and Guildhall as the Lead for Jazz, Improvisation and Pop

Awards and honors
Yeoh won The Independent award for Best Jazz Musician of the Year in 1996 and in 1999 was a semi-finalist at the piano competition at the Montreux Jazz Festival. She won Jazz FM Instrumentalist of the Year in 2017.

Discography
 Piano Language with Joanna MacGregor
 Mutual Serenade with  Cleveland Watkiss
  Solo Gemini for solo piano

References

External links

1973 births
21st-century pianists
21st-century English women musicians
British people of Malaysian descent
English reggae musicians
English electronic musicians
English jazz pianists
English people of Malaysian descent
Jazz fusion keyboardists
Living people
Women jazz pianists
Women keyboardists
The Roots members
21st-century women pianists